The Raleigh Latin School was a private classical non-denominational religious education secondary school in Raleigh, North Carolina. It closed in 2008 after four years in operation.

References

Educational institutions disestablished in 2008
Private schools in Raleigh, North Carolina
Defunct schools in North Carolina